Gainesville station may refer to:

Gainesville station (Georgia), a train station in Gainesville, Georgia, serving Amtrak
Gainesville station (Texas), a train station in Gainesville, Texas, serving Amtrak
Gainesville station (Virginia), a proposed train station in Gainesville, Virginia, serving Virginia Railway Express
Old Gainesville Depot, a former train station in Gainesville, Florida